Seaside High School may refer to:

Seaside High School (California), located in Seaside, California
Seaside High School (Oregon), located in Seaside, Oregon